Clepsis terevalva is a species of moth of the family Tortricidae. It is found in Zamora-Chinchipe Province, Ecuador.

The wingspan is about 15 mm. The ground colour of the forewings is brownish with brown marginal lines. The hindwings are whitish, slightly tinged with brownish on the periphery.

Etymology
The species name refers to the structure of the valva and is derived from Greek teren (meaning delicate).

References

Moths described in 2008
Clepsis